Durbat (Russian and Tajik: Дурбат) is a village and jamoat in Tajikistan. It is part of the city of Hisor in Districts of Republican Subordination. The jamoat has a total population of 20,052 (2015).

References

Populated places in Districts of Republican Subordination
Jamoats of Tajikistan